the 2014 New York State Senate 34th District Democratic primary was fought between incumbent Jeffrey Klein and challenger Oliver Koppell.

Challenge
Former NY Attorney General, and City Council rep Oliver Koppell announced that he would stop the Independent Democratic Conference (IDC), led by Klein; by winning his seat. Soon after, more people such as John Liu joined Koppell in his attempts to defeat the IDC by running for state senate in their own districts.
NY governor candidate Zephyr Teachout endorsed Koppell.

Election
In the first 5 minutes of the election, Koppell trailed Klein just 4 votes.

At 10:50 PM Eastern Standard time, Koppell conceded to Klein with 33% of the votes in.

The East Bronx
Jeff Klein saw a landslide win against Koppell in the East Bronx, by over 1,000 votes.

Riverdale
Oliver Koppell took Riverdale by just 400 votes.

South Westchester
Klein took South Westchester by 600 votes.

References

State Senate 34th